Peter Grounds is an Australian former professional rugby league footballer who played in the 1980s. He played for Eastern Suburbs and Balmain in the NSWRL competition.

Playing career
Grounds made his first grade debut for Balmain in round 4 of the 1981 NSWRFL season against Canterbury at Leichhardt Oval. Grounds played on the wing in the clubs 52-13 loss. Grounds played a total of four matches in his first season with the club as Balmain came last on the table and claimed only the third Wooden Spoon in their long history. After a further year with Balmain, Grounds signed for Eastern Suburbs where he spent the next two seasons. In 1986, Grounds returned to Balmain and played a further two matches for the club.

References

Sydney Roosters players
Balmain Tigers players
1960 births
Australian rugby league players
Rugby league wingers
Rugby league centres
Living people